The 2010 Italian Grand Prix (formally the Formula 1 Gran Premio Santander d'Italia 2010) was the fourteenth round of the 2010 Formula One season. It was held in Autodromo Nazionale di Monza, Monza, Italy on 12 September 2010. Ferrari's Fernando Alonso won the race from pole position, taking Ferrari's first win on home soil since 2006 and their last until 2019.

Report

Background

On the Wednesday before the race, Ferrari were summoned before the FIA World Motor Sport Council to answer charges related to fixing a race outcome through the use of team orders – banned since 2003 under Article 39.1 of the sporting regulations following an infamous incident at the 2002 Austrian Grand Prix – and subsequently bringing the sport into disrepute at the German Grand Prix. Although Ferrari were fined US$100,000 at the time of the incident, the special meeting of the WMSC opened the door for further sanctions. The tribunal eventually decided against punishing the team further, with a promise to review the ban on team orders, a decision that was received negatively by fans.

Following increased speculation over Red Bull and Ferrari appearing to use flexible bodywork – banned under the sporting regulations – the FIA announced its intention to intensify testing procedures for the second time, having increased lateral load-bearing tests on the front wings at Spa-Francorchamps. Speculation within the Belgian paddock suggested that both teams had been using flexible floors to lower the front wings closer to the roadway, giving rise to the FIA's plan for stricter testing at Monza. On the Wednesday before the race, McLaren admitted to changing the floor of the MP4-25 to meet the increased load tests.

Lewis Hamilton led the drivers' championship and Mark Webber went into this race 3 points behind, since Sebastian Vettel, Jenson Button and Fernando Alonso did not score in Belgium. They were over a race win behind Hamilton and Webber. Sakon Yamamoto took Karun Chandhok's seat again for the Italian Grand Prix.

Qualifying
The first qualifying session saw all six cars from the new teams knocked out, with Jarno Trulli in the Lotus leading among them in 18th. His teammate Heikki Kovalainen was 19th and then came Vitantonio Liuzzi, whose Force India had had technical issues. Timo Glock had originally been ahead of Liuzzi in his Virgin, but he was handed a five place grid penalty for changing his gearbox, putting him at the very back. Lucas di Grassi was 21st in the other Virgin ahead of Bruno Senna and Sakon Yamamoto in the HRTs.

There were no real surprises in the second qualifying session either, as the two BMW Saubers of Kamui Kobayashi (13th) and Pedro de la Rosa (17th) were eliminated along with the Toro Rossos of Sébastien Buemi and Jaime Alguersuari, the Force India of Adrian Sutil and Michael Schumacher's Mercedes. Also eliminated was Vitaly Petrov, who qualified his Renault 15th but was given a five place grid drop for blocking Glock in the first session.

Rubens Barrichello scraped into the top 10 and qualified tenth in his Williams, just behind Robert Kubica in the other Renault. It was a good performance from the other Williams of Nico Hülkenberg, who out qualified his teammate to qualify eighth. Nico Rosberg was probably pleased with seventh in the Mercedes, but then came the championship contenders. A mistake put Sebastian Vettel sixth, and it was a tough day for his Red Bull team as Mark Webber could only qualify fourth in the sister RB6. The two McLarens of Lewis Hamilton and Jenson Button had chosen completely different car set ups, and it did not work out for Hamilton who could qualify only fifth. It was looking good for Ferrari in front of their home crowd, and Felipe Massa qualified third. It was their day as Button was pipped to pole by Fernando Alonso, the 19th pole of the Spaniard's career.

Race
At the start of the race, Jenson Button had a fantastic start, jumping his McLaren from second past Fernando Alonso's Ferrari. Alonso, who was alongside his teammate Felipe Massa through the turn one chicane, just clipped the rear of Button's diffuser, but there was only light damage to the McLaren. As the pack headed down to the second chicane of turns three and four, Button's teammate Lewis Hamilton, who was in fourth, tried to pull a move on Massa, but there was contact between the two. Although Lewis tried to carry on, the front track rod was broken and he pulled up at the next corner. Massa managed to carry on unscathed. Kamui Kobayashi did start the race but retired his BMW Sauber on the first lap with a gearbox failure.

Meanwhile, Mark Webber in the Red Bull was going backwards from his fourth place grid slot, and he was ninth at the end of the first lap. He soon re-passed Michael Schumacher's Mercedes at the second chicane on lap 6, with a calm and collected move on the seven times world champion. A hydraulic failure made Bruno Senna's HRT the race's third retirement on lap 11.

Alonso was harrying Button all the way, and drama occurred further back on lap 20 as Webber's teammate Sebastian Vettel, who had also had a bad start, dropping from 6th to 7th and was harrying Nico Hülkenberg in the Williams to take the place back, complained of an engine issue in the Red Bull's Renault power unit. Webber sailed past and Vettel was just dropping back into the clutches of compatriot Schumacher when he suddenly regained power, and began to close in on Hülkenberg and Webber.

Button made his pit stop on lap 36, and by staying out for one lap longer Alonso rejoined ahead of Button after his stop, although his teammate Massa actually held 1st for two laps before his own pit-stop relegated him back to 3rd. It was very tight as Alonso exited the pits, but the Spaniard just managed to stay ahead by holding the racing line as the two were side by side through turns one and two. Jarno Trulli was the race's next retirement in the Lotus with a gearbox failure on lap 46.

After even more off track adventures for Hülkenberg, he was finally passed by Webber with just four laps to go, and the Aussie was visibly frustrated by then. On the same lap, Lucas di Grassi's Virgin suffered a suspension failure. After his phantom technical failure, the Red Bull mechanics had decided to leave Vettel's stop to the last lap, which they did, and the gamble paid off handsomely as the German emerged from the pits still in fourth place, ahead of his teammate.

Alonso crossed the line in first place to the delight of the Tifosi, with Button still less than three seconds in arrears. Massa was third to complete a fantastic double home podium for the Scuderia, while Vettel drove a brilliant recovery drive to bring the Red Bull home fourth, holding off a late challenge from Nico Rosberg, who had had a quiet race for Mercedes. Webber, Hülkenberg and Robert Kubica's Renault were all in close attendance, while Schumacher and Rubens Barrichello's Williams rounded out the points.

Classification

Qualifying 

Notes:
 Vitaly Petrov was handed a 5-place grid penalty for blocking Timo Glock in the first part of qualifying.
 Timo Glock was handed a 5-place grid penalty for a gearbox change.

Race 

 Kamui Kobayashi started from the pit lane.
 Di Grassi was classified for completing 90% of the race winner's distance.

Championship standings after the race

Drivers' Championship standings

Constructors' Championship standings

 Note: Only the top five positions are included for both sets of standings.
 Bold text indicates competitors who still had a theoretical chance of becoming World Champion.

See also 
 2010 Monza GP2 Series round
 2010 Monza GP3 Series round

References

External links 

Italian
Italian Grand Prix
Grand Prix
Italian Grand Prix